The 2010 FIBA U16 European Championship Division C was held in Andorra la Vella, Andorra, from 26 to 31 July 2010. Eight teams participated in the competition.

Participating teams
 (hosts)

Group phase

Group A

Group B

Knockout stage

Bracket

5–8th place bracket

Final standings

2009–10 in European basketball
FIBA Europe Under-16 Championship
July 2010 sports events in Europe
FIBA U16 European Championship Division C